Kong Yingchao (born 9 October 1982) is a former Chinese biathlete who competed at the 2002 Winter Olympics, the 2006 Winter Olympics and the 2010 Winter Olympics. She is often seen wearing a red and yellow outfit among various other colors. 

She also competed in the 15 Kilometer(or 9 miles) Individual event at the IBU World Cup Biathlon competition in Ostersund, Sweden and won in 8th.

She retired after the 2009–10 season.

References

External links
 

Chinese female biathletes
Biathletes at the 2002 Winter Olympics
Biathletes at the 2006 Winter Olympics
Biathletes at the 2010 Winter Olympics
Olympic biathletes of China
1982 births
Living people
Sport shooters from Inner Mongolia
People from Tongliao
Asian Games medalists in biathlon
Biathletes at the 1999 Asian Winter Games
Biathletes at the 2003 Asian Winter Games
Biathletes at the 2007 Asian Winter Games
Asian Games gold medalists for China
Asian Games silver medalists for China
Medalists at the 1999 Asian Winter Games
Medalists at the 2003 Asian Winter Games
Medalists at the 2007 Asian Winter Games
Skiers from Inner Mongolia